Yuriy Vynnychuk (18 March 1952, Stanislav, now Ivano-Frankivsk) is a Ukrainian journalist, writer and editor.

Biography 
Educated in the Vasyl Stefanyk Subcarpathian National University (formerly Ivano-Frankivsk Pedagogical Institute), Faculty of Philology (1969–1973 years), a teacher of Ukrainian language and literature.

In 1974 he moved to the city and worked as a loader, graphic designers.

1987–1991 — director of Lviv Theatre of Variety "Do not worry!". He was the author of the script for the play "Do not worry!" and song lyrics. In 1990 he had to leave the theater and together with Stefka Orobets created "Cabarete Yurtsya and Steftsya".

1991–1994 — editor of mysticism and sensational newspaper "Post-Postup".

1995–1998 — chief editor of "Gulvіsa", Lviv.

1998–1999 — editor of the newspaper "Postup".

Since 2006 — chief editor of "Post-Postup" (restored).

Member of the Association of Ukrainian Writers (1997).

Awards
Vynnychuk's novel The Tango of Death was awarded the BBC Ukrainian Book of the Year for 2012. The novel is set in Lviv, in the period between the two world wars. The novel is marked with Vynnychuk's trademark fusion of tragedy and humor. The award was Vynnychuk's second BBC Ukrainian Book of the Year. He won the inaugural award in 2005 for his novel Spring Games In Autumn Gardens.

Political prosecution by Yanukovych regime (2012) 
On January 23, 2012 two policemen came to Vynnychuk's house and asked him to explain in writing about a poem he had recited a few months ago at the “A Night of Erotic Poetry” festival held in Kyiv. A complaint had been lodged with the prosecutor general by the Communist MP, Leonid Hrach, who accused the writer of reciting a poem that was like pornography and inciting a revolt against the Ukrainian government.

Yuriy Vynnychuk's works translated in English 
The Fantastic Worlds of Yuri Vynnychuk (collected short stories). Translated in English by Michael M. Naydan. (Glagoslav Publications, 2016) 
Tango of Death (novel). Translated from the Ukrainian by Michael M. Naydan and Olha Tytarenko. Translation edited by Ludmilla A. Trigos. (Spuyten Duyvil, 2019)

See also

 List of Ukrainian-language writers
 Ukrainian literature

References

External links 
 
 Biography

1952 births
Living people
Writers from Ivano-Frankivsk
Ukrainian journalists
Ukrainian translators
Ukrainian science fiction writers
Ukrainian fantasy writers
Ukrainian editors
Vasyl Stefanyk Subcarpathian National University alumni